Titan is the largest moon of Saturn and the second-largest natural satellite in the Solar System. It is the only moon known to have a dense atmosphere, and is the only known object in space other than Earth on which clear evidence of stable bodies of surface liquid has been found.

Titan is one of the seven gravitationally rounded moons in orbit around Saturn, and the second most distant from Saturn of those seven. Frequently described as a planet-like moon, Titan is 50% larger (in diameter) than Earth's Moon and 80% more massive. It is the second-largest moon in the Solar System after Jupiter's moon Ganymede, and is larger than the planet Mercury, but only 40% as massive.

Discovered in 1655 by the Dutch astronomer Christiaan Huygens, Titan was the first known moon of Saturn, and the sixth known planetary satellite (after Earth's moon and the four Galilean moons of Jupiter). Titan orbits Saturn at 20 Saturn radii. From Titan's surface, Saturn subtends an arc of 5.09 degrees, and if it were visible through the moon's thick atmosphere, it would appear 11.4 times larger in the sky, in diameter, than the Moon from Earth, which subtends 0.48° of arc.

Titan is primarily composed of ice and rocky material, which is likely differentiated into a rocky core surrounded by various layers of ice, including a crust of ice Ih and a subsurface layer of ammonia-rich liquid water. Much as with Venus before the Space Age, the dense opaque atmosphere prevented understanding of Titan's surface until the Cassini–Huygens mission in 2004 provided new information, including the discovery of liquid hydrocarbon lakes in Titan's polar regions. The geologically young surface is generally smooth, with few impact craters, although mountains and several possible cryovolcanoes have been found.

The atmosphere of Titan is largely nitrogen; minor components lead to the formation of methane and ethane clouds and heavy organonitrogen haze. The climate—including wind and rain—creates surface features similar to those of Earth, such as dunes, rivers, lakes, seas (probably of liquid methane and ethane), and deltas, and is dominated by seasonal weather patterns as on Earth.

History

Discovery 

Titan was discovered on March 25, 1655, by the Dutch astronomer Christiaan Huygens. Huygens was inspired by Galileo's discovery of Jupiter's four largest moons in 1610 and his improvements in telescope technology. Christiaan, with the help of his elder brother Constantijn Huygens Jr., began building telescopes around 1650 and discovered the first observed moon orbiting Saturn with one of the telescopes they built. It was the sixth moon ever discovered, after Earth's Moon and the Galilean moons of Jupiter.

Naming 
Huygens named his discovery Saturni Luna (or Luna Saturni, Latin for "moon of Saturn"), publishing in the 1655 tract De Saturni Luna Observatio Nova (A New Observation of Saturn's Moon). After Giovanni Domenico Cassini published his discoveries of four more moons of Saturn between 1673 and 1686, astronomers fell into the habit of referring to these and Titan as Saturn I through V (with Titan then in fourth position). Other early epithets for Titan include "Saturn's ordinary satellite". The International Astronomical Union officially numbers Titan as Saturn VI.

The name Titan, and the names of all seven satellites of Saturn then known, came from John Herschel (son of William Herschel, discoverer of two other Saturnian moons, Mimas and Enceladus), in his 1847 publication Results of Astronomical Observations Made during the Years 1834, 5, 6, 7, 8, at the Cape of Good Hope. Numerous small moons have been discovered around Saturn since then. Saturnian moons are named after mythological giants. The name Titan comes from the Titans, a race of immortals in Greek mythology.

Orbit and rotation 

Titan orbits Saturn once every 15 days and 22 hours. Like Earth's Moon and many of the satellites of the giant planets, its rotational period (its day) is identical to its orbital period; Titan is tidally locked in synchronous rotation with Saturn, and permanently shows one face to the planet. Longitudes on Titan are measured westward, starting from the meridian passing through this point. Its orbital eccentricity is 0.0288, and the orbital plane is inclined 0.348 degrees relative to the Saturnian equator, and hence also about a third of a degree off of the equatorial ring plane. Viewed from Earth, Titan reaches an angular distance of about 20 Saturn radii (just over ) from Saturn and subtends a disk 0.8 arcseconds in diameter.

The small, irregularly shaped satellite Hyperion is locked in a 3:4 orbital resonance with Titan. Hyperion probably formed in a stable orbital island, whereas the massive Titan absorbed or ejected any other bodies that made close approaches.

Bulk characteristics 

Titan is the tenth-largest object in the solar system, including the Sun. Before the arrival of Voyager 1 in 1980, Titan was thought to be slightly larger than Ganymede (diameter ) and thus the largest moon in the Solar System; this was an overestimation caused by Titan's dense, opaque atmosphere, with a haze layer 100-200 kilometres above its surface. This increases its apparent diameter. Titan's diameter and mass (and thus its density) are similar to those of the Jovian moons Ganymede and Callisto. Based on its bulk density of 1.88 g/cm3, Titan's composition is half ice and half rocky material. Though similar in composition to Dione and Enceladus, it is denser due to gravitational compression. It has a mass 1/4226 that of Saturn, making it the largest moon of the gas giants relative to the mass of its primary. It is second in terms of relative diameter of moons to a gas giant; Titan being 1/22.609 of Saturn's diameter, Triton is larger in diameter relative to Neptune at 1/18.092.

Titan is probably partially differentiated into distinct layers with a  rocky center. This rocky center is surrounded by several layers composed of different crystalline forms of ice. Its interior may still be hot enough for a liquid layer consisting of a "magma" composed of water and ammonia between the ice Ih crust and deeper ice layers made of high-pressure forms of ice. The Cassini probe discovered the evidence for the layered structure in the form of natural extremely-low-frequency radio waves in Titan's atmosphere. Titan's surface is thought to be a poor reflector of extremely-low-frequency radio waves, so they may instead be reflecting off the liquid–ice boundary of a subsurface ocean. Further supporting evidence for a liquid layer and ice shell decoupled from the solid core comes from the way the gravity field varies as Titan orbits Saturn. Comparison of the gravity field with the RADAR-based topography observations also suggests that the ice shell may be substantially rigid.

Formation 
The moons of Jupiter and Saturn are thought to have formed through co-accretion, a similar process to that believed to have formed the planets in the Solar System. As the young gas giants formed, they were surrounded by discs of material that gradually coalesced into moons. Whereas Jupiter possesses four large satellites in highly regular, planet-like orbits, Titan overwhelmingly dominates Saturn's system and possesses a high orbital eccentricity not immediately explained by co-accretion alone. A proposed model for the formation of Titan is that Saturn's system began with a group of moons similar to Jupiter's Galilean satellites, but that they were disrupted by a series of giant impacts, which would go on to form Titan. Saturn's mid-sized moons, such as Iapetus and Rhea, were formed from the debris of these collisions. Such a violent beginning would also explain Titan's orbital eccentricity.

A 2014 analysis of Titan's atmospheric nitrogen suggested that it was possibly sourced from material similar to that found in the Oort cloud and not from sources present during co-accretion of materials around Saturn.

Atmosphere 

Titan is the only known moon with a significant atmosphere, and its atmosphere is the only nitrogen-rich dense atmosphere in the Solar System aside from Earth's. Observations of it made in 2004 by Cassini suggest that Titan is a "super rotator", like Venus, with an atmosphere that rotates much faster than its surface. Observations from the Voyager space probes have shown that Titan's atmosphere is denser than Earth's, with a surface pressure about 1.45 atm. It is also about 1.19 times as massive as Earth's overall, or about 7.3 times more massive on a per surface area basis. Opaque haze layers block most visible light from the Sun and other sources and obscure Titan's surface features. Titan's lower gravity means that its atmosphere is far more extended than Earth's. The atmosphere of Titan is opaque at many wavelengths and as a result, a complete reflectance spectrum of the surface is impossible to acquire from orbit. It was not until the arrival of the Cassini–Huygens spacecraft in 2004 that the first direct images of Titan's surface were obtained.

Titan's atmospheric composition is nitrogen (97%), methane (2.7±0.1%), and hydrogen (0.1–0.2%), with trace amounts of other gases. There are trace amounts of other hydrocarbons, such as ethane, diacetylene, methylacetylene, acetylene and propane, and of other gases, such as cyanoacetylene, hydrogen cyanide, carbon dioxide, carbon monoxide, cyanogen, argon and helium. The hydrocarbons are thought to form in Titan's upper atmosphere in reactions resulting from the breakup of methane by the Sun's ultraviolet light, producing a thick orange smog. Titan spends 95% of its time within Saturn's magnetosphere, which may help shield it from the solar wind.

Energy from the Sun should have converted all traces of methane in Titan's atmosphere into more complex hydrocarbons within 50 million years—a short time compared to the age of the Solar System. This suggests that methane must be replenished by a reservoir on or within Titan itself. The ultimate origin of the methane in its atmosphere may be its interior, released via eruptions from cryovolcanoes.

On April 3, 2013, NASA reported that complex organic chemicals, collectively called tholins, likely arise on Titan, based on studies simulating the atmosphere of Titan.

On June 6, 2013, scientists at the IAA-CSIC reported the detection of polycyclic aromatic hydrocarbons in the upper atmosphere of Titan.

On September 30, 2013, propene was detected in the atmosphere of Titan by NASA's Cassini spacecraft, using its composite infrared spectrometer (CIRS). This is the first time propene has been found on any moon or planet other than Earth and is the first chemical found by the CIRS. The detection of propene fills a mysterious gap in observations that date back to NASA's Voyager 1 spacecraft's first close planetary flyby of Titan in 1980, during which it was discovered that many of the gases that make up Titan's brown haze were hydrocarbons, theoretically formed via the recombination of radicals created by the Sun's ultraviolet photolysis of methane.

On October 24, 2014, methane was found in polar clouds on Titan. On December 1, 2022, astronomers reported viewing clouds, likely made of methane, moving across Titan, using the James Webb Space Telescope.

Climate 

At this temperature, water ice has an extremely low vapor pressure, so the little water vapor present appears limited to the stratosphere. Titan receives about 1% as much sunlight as Earth. Before sunlight reaches the surface, about 90% has been absorbed by the thick atmosphere, leaving only 0.1% of the amount of light Earth receives.

Atmospheric methane creates a greenhouse effect on Titan's surface, without which Titan would be much colder. Conversely, haze in Titan's atmosphere contributes to an anti-greenhouse effect by absorbing sunlight, cancelling a portion of the greenhouse effect and making its surface significantly colder than its upper atmosphere.

Titan's clouds, probably composed of methane, ethane or other simple organics, are scattered and variable, punctuating the overall haze. The findings of the Huygens probe indicate that Titan's atmosphere periodically rains liquid methane and other organic compounds onto its surface.

Clouds typically cover 1% of Titan's disk, though outburst events have been observed in which the cloud cover rapidly expands to as much as 8%. One hypothesis asserts that the southern clouds are formed when heightened levels of sunlight during the southern summer generate uplift in the atmosphere, resulting in convection. This explanation is complicated by the fact that cloud formation has been observed not only after the southern summer solstice but also during mid-spring. Increased methane humidity at the south pole possibly contributes to the rapid increases in cloud size. It was summer in Titan's southern hemisphere until 2010, when Saturn's orbit, which governs Titan's motion, moved Titan's northern hemisphere into the sunlight. When the seasons switch, it is expected that ethane will begin to condense over the south pole.

Surface features 

The surface of Titan has been described as "complex, fluid-processed, [and] geologically young". Titan has been around since the Solar System's formation, but its surface is much younger, between 100 million and 1 billion years old. Geological processes may have reshaped Titan's surface. Titan's atmosphere is four times as thick as Earth's, making it difficult for astronomical instruments to image its surface in the visible light spectrum. The Cassini spacecraft used infrared instruments, radar altimetry and synthetic aperture radar (SAR) imaging to map portions of Titan during its close fly-bys. The first images revealed a diverse geology, with both rough and smooth areas. There are features that may be volcanic in origin, disgorging water mixed with ammonia onto the surface. There is also evidence that Titan's ice shell may be substantially rigid, which would suggest little geologic activity.

There are also streaky features, some of them hundreds of kilometers in length, that appear to be caused by windblown particles. Examination has also shown the surface to be relatively smooth; the few objects that seem to be impact craters appeared to have been filled in, perhaps by raining hydrocarbons or volcanoes. Radar altimetry suggests height variation is low, typically no more than 150 meters. Occasional elevation changes of 500 meters have been discovered and Titan has mountains that sometimes reach several hundred meters to more than 1 kilometer in height.

Titan's surface is marked by broad regions of bright and dark terrain. These include Xanadu, a large, reflective equatorial area about the size of Australia. It was first identified in infrared images from the Hubble Space Telescope in 1994, and later viewed by the Cassini spacecraft. The convoluted region is filled with hills and cut by valleys and chasms. It is criss-crossed in places by dark lineaments—sinuous topographical features resembling ridges or crevices. These may represent tectonic activity, which would indicate that Xanadu is geologically young. Alternatively, the lineaments may be liquid-formed channels, suggesting old terrain that has been cut through by stream systems. There are dark areas of similar size elsewhere on Titan, observed from the ground and by Cassini; at least one of these, Ligeia Mare, Titan's second-largest sea, is almost a pure methane sea.

Lakes 

The possibility of hydrocarbon seas on Titan was first suggested based on Voyager 1 and 2 data that showed Titan to have a thick atmosphere of approximately the correct temperature and composition to support them, but direct evidence was not obtained until 1995 when data from Hubble and other observations suggested the existence of liquid methane on Titan, either in disconnected pockets or on the scale of satellite-wide oceans, similar to water on Earth.

The Cassini mission confirmed the former hypothesis. When the probe arrived in the Saturnian system in 2004, it was hoped that hydrocarbon lakes or oceans would be detected from the sunlight reflected off their surface, but no specular reflections were initially observed. Near Titan's south pole, an enigmatic dark feature named Ontario Lacus was identified (and later confirmed to be a lake). A possible shoreline was also identified near the pole via radar imagery. Following a flyby on July 22, 2006, in which the Cassini spacecraft's radar imaged the northern latitudes (that were then in winter), several large, smooth (and thus dark to radar) patches were seen dotting the surface near the pole. Based on the observations, scientists announced "definitive evidence of lakes filled with methane on Saturn's moon Titan" in January 2007. The Cassini–Huygens team concluded that the imaged features are almost certainly the long-sought hydrocarbon lakes, the first stable bodies of surface liquid found outside Earth. Some appear to have channels associated with liquid and lie in topographical depressions. The liquid erosion features appear to be a very recent occurrence: channels in some regions have created surprisingly little erosion, suggesting erosion on Titan is extremely slow, or some other recent phenomena may have wiped out older riverbeds and landforms. Overall, the Cassini radar observations have shown that lakes cover only a small percentage of the surface, making Titan much drier than Earth. Most of the lakes are concentrated near the poles (where the relative lack of sunlight prevents evaporation), but several long-standing hydrocarbon lakes in the equatorial desert regions have also been discovered, including one near the Huygens landing site in the Shangri-La region, which is about half the size of the Great Salt Lake in Utah, USA. The equatorial lakes are probably "oases", i.e. the likely supplier is underground aquifers.

In June 2008, the Visual and Infrared Mapping Spectrometer on Cassini confirmed the presence of liquid ethane beyond doubt in Ontario Lacus. On December 21, 2008, Cassini passed directly over Ontario Lacus and observed specular reflection in radar. The strength of the reflection saturated the probe's receiver, indicating that the lake level did not vary by more than 3 mm (implying either that surface winds were minimal, or the lake's hydrocarbon fluid is viscous).

On July 8, 2009, Cassini's VIMS observed a specular reflection indicative of a smooth, mirror-like surface, off what today is called Jingpo Lacus, a lake in the north polar region shortly after the area emerged from 15 years of winter darkness. Specular reflections are indicative of a smooth, mirror-like surface, so the observation corroborated the inference of the presence of a large liquid body drawn from radar imaging.

In contrast, the northern hemisphere's Ligeia Mare was initially mapped to depths exceeding 8 m, the maximum discernable by the radar instrument and the analysis techniques of the time.
While only the second largest of Titan's methane seas, Ligeia "contains enough liquid methane to fill three Lake Michigans".

In May 2013, Cassini'''s radar altimeter observed Titan's Vid Flumina channels, defined as a drainage network connected to Titan's second largest hydrocarbon sea, Ligeia Mare. Analysis of the received altimeter echoes showed that the channels are located in deep (up to ~570 m), steep-sided, canyons and have strong specular surface reflections that indicate they are currently filled with liquid. Elevations of the liquid in these channels are at the same level as Ligeia Mare to within a vertical precision of about 0.7 m, consistent with the interpretation of drowned river valleys. Specular reflections are also observed in lower order tributaries elevated above the level of Ligeia Mare, consistent with drainage feeding into the main channel system. This is likely the first direct evidence of the presence of liquid channels on Titan and the first observation of hundred-meter deep canyons on Titan. Vid Flumina canyons are thus drowned by the sea but there are a few isolated observations to attest to the presence of surface liquids standing at higher elevations.

During six flybys of Titan from 2006 to 2011, Cassini gathered radiometric tracking and optical navigation data from which investigators could roughly infer Titan's changing shape. The density of Titan is consistent with a body that is about 60% rock and 40% water. The team's analyses suggest that Titan's surface can rise and fall by up to 10 metres during each orbit. That degree of warping suggests that Titan's interior is relatively deformable, and that the most likely model of Titan is one in which an icy shell dozens of kilometres thick floats atop a global ocean. On July 2, 2014, NASA reported the ocean inside Titan may be as salty as the Dead Sea. On September 3, 2014, NASA reported studies suggesting methane rainfall on Titan may interact with a layer of icy materials underground, called an "alkanofer", to produce ethane and propane that may eventually feed into rivers and lakes.

In 2016, Cassini found the first evidence of fluid-filled channels on Titan, in a series of deep, steep-sided canyons flowing into Ligeia Mare. This network of canyons, dubbed Vid Flumina, range in depth from 240 to 570 m and have sides as steep as 40°. They are believed to have formed either by crustal uplifting, like Earth's Grand Canyon, or a lowering of sea level, or perhaps a combination of the two. The depth of erosion suggests that liquid flows in this part of Titan are long-term features that persist for thousands of years.

 Impact craters 

Radar, SAR and imaging data from Cassini have revealed few impact craters on Titan's surface. These impacts appear to be relatively young, compared to Titan's age. The few impact craters discovered include a  two-ring impact basin named Menrva seen by Cassini's ISS as a bright-dark concentric pattern. A smaller, flat-floored crater named Sinlap and a  crater with a central peak and dark floor named Ksa have also been observed. Radar and Cassini imaging have also revealed "crateriforms", circular features on the surface of Titan that may be impact related, but lack certain features that would make identification certain. For example, a  ring of bright, rough material known as Guabonito has been observed by Cassini. This feature is thought to be an impact crater filled in by dark, windblown sediment. Several other similar features have been observed in the dark Shangri-La and Aaru regions. Radar observed several circular features that may be craters in the bright region Xanadu during Cassini's April 30, 2006 flyby of Titan.

Many of Titan's craters or probable craters display evidence of extensive erosion, and all show some indication of modification. Most large craters have breached or incomplete rims, despite the fact that some craters on Titan have relatively more massive rims than those anywhere else in the Solar System. There is little evidence of formation of palimpsests through viscoelastic crustal relaxation, unlike on other large icy moons. Most craters lack central peaks and have smooth floors, possibly due to impact-generation or later eruption of cryovolcanic lava. Infill from various geological processes is one reason for Titan's relative deficiency of craters; atmospheric shielding also plays a role. It is estimated that Titan's atmosphere reduces the number of craters on its surface by a factor of two.

The limited high-resolution radar coverage of Titan obtained through 2007 (22%) suggested the existence of nonuniformities in its crater distribution. Xanadu has 2–9 times more craters than elsewhere. The leading hemisphere has a 30% higher density than the trailing hemisphere. There are lower crater densities in areas of equatorial dunes and in the north polar region (where hydrocarbon lakes and seas are most common).

Pre-Cassini models of impact trajectories and angles suggest that where the impactor strikes the water ice crust, a small amount of ejecta remains as liquid water within the crater. It may persist as liquid for centuries or longer, sufficient for "the synthesis of simple precursor molecules to the origin of life".

 Cryovolcanism and mountains 

Scientists have long speculated that conditions on Titan resemble those of early Earth, though at a much lower temperature. The detection of argon-40 in the atmosphere in 2004 indicated that volcanoes had spawned plumes of "lava" composed of water and ammonia. Global maps of the lake distribution on Titan's surface revealed that there is not enough surface methane to account for its continued presence in its atmosphere, and thus that a significant portion must be added through volcanic processes.

Still, there is a paucity of surface features that can be unambiguously interpreted as cryovolcanoes. One of the first of such features revealed by Cassini radar observations in 2004, called Ganesa Macula, resembles the geographic features called "pancake domes" found on Venus, and was thus initially thought to be cryovolcanic in origin, until Kirk et al. refuted this hypothesis at the American Geophysical Union annual meeting in December 2008. The feature was found to be not a dome at all, but appeared to result from accidental combination of light and dark patches. In 2004 Cassini also detected an unusually bright feature (called Tortola Facula), which was interpreted as a cryovolcanic dome. No similar features have been identified as of 2010. In December 2008, astronomers announced the discovery of two transient but unusually long-lived "bright spots" in Titan's atmosphere, which appear too persistent to be explained by mere weather patterns, suggesting they were the result of extended cryovolcanic episodes.

This range lies in the southern hemisphere and is thought to be composed of icy material and covered in methane snow. The movement of tectonic plates, perhaps influenced by a nearby impact basin, could have opened a gap through which the mountain's material upwelled. Prior to Cassini, scientists assumed that most of the topography on Titan would be impact structures, yet these findings reveal that similar to Earth, the mountains were formed through geological processes.

In 2008 Jeffrey Moore (planetary geologist of Ames Research Center) proposed an alternate view of Titan's geology. Noting that no volcanic features had been unambiguously identified on Titan so far, he asserted that Titan is a geologically dead world, whose surface is shaped only by impact cratering, fluvial and eolian erosion, mass wasting and other exogenic processes. According to this hypothesis, methane is not emitted by volcanoes but slowly diffuses out of Titan's cold and stiff interior. Ganesa Macula may be an eroded impact crater with a dark dune in the center. The mountainous ridges observed in some regions can be explained as heavily degraded scarps of large multi-ring impact structures or as a result of the global contraction due to the slow cooling of the interior. The bright Xanadu terrain may be a degraded heavily cratered terrain similar to that observed on the surface of Callisto. Indeed, were it not for its lack of an atmosphere, Callisto could serve as a model for Titan's geology in this scenario. Jeffrey Moore even called Titan Callisto with weather.

In March 2009, structures resembling lava flows were announced in a region of Titan called Hotei Arcus, which appears to fluctuate in brightness over several months.

In December 2010, the Cassini mission team announced the most compelling possible cryovolcano yet found. Named Sotra Patera, it is one in a chain of at least three mountains, each between 1000 and 1500 m in height, several of which are topped by large craters. The ground around their bases appears to be overlaid by frozen lava flows.

Crater-like landforms possibly formed via explosive, maar-like or caldera-forming cryovolcanic eruptions have been identified in Titan's polar regions. These formations are sometimes nested or overlapping and have features suggestive of explosions and collapses, such as elevated rims, halos, and internal hills or mountains. The polar location of these features and their colocalization with Titan's lakes and seas suggests volatiles such as methane may help power them. Some of these features appear quite fresh, suggesting that such volcanic activity continues to the present.

Most of Titan's highest peaks occur near its equator in so-called "ridge belts". They are believed to be analogous to Earth's fold mountains such as the Rockies or the Himalayas, formed by the collision and buckling of tectonic plates, or to subduction zones like the Andes, where upwelling lava (or cryolava) from a melting descending plate rises to the surface. One possible mechanism for their formation is tidal forces from Saturn. Because Titan's icy mantle is less viscous than Earth's magma mantle, and because its icy bedrock is softer than Earth's granite bedrock, mountains are unlikely to reach heights as great as those on Earth. In 2016, the Cassini team announced what they believe to be the tallest mountain on Titan. Located in the Mithrim Montes range, it is 3,337 m tall.

If volcanism on Titan really exists, the hypothesis is that it is driven by energy released from the decay of radioactive elements within the mantle, as it is on Earth. Magma on Earth is made of liquid rock, which is less dense than the solid rocky crust through which it erupts. Because ice is less dense than water, Titan's watery magma would be denser than its solid icy crust. This means that cryovolcanism on Titan would require a large amount of additional energy to operate, possibly via tidal flexing from nearby Saturn.  The low-pressure ice, overlaying a liquid layer of ammonium sulfate, ascends buoyantly, and the unstable system can produce dramatic plume events. Titan is resurfaced through the process by grain-sized ice and ammonium sulfate ash, which helps produce a wind-shaped landscape and sand dune features. Titan may have been much more geologically active in the past; models of Titan's internal evolution suggest that Titan's crust was only 10 kilometers thick until about 500 million years ago, allowing vigorous cryovolcanism with low viscosity water magmas to erase all surface features formed before that time. Titan's modern geology would have formed only after the crust thickened to 50 kilometers and thus impeded constant cryovolcanic resurfacing, with any cryovolcanism occurring since that time producing much more viscous water magma with larger fractions of ammonia and methanol; this would also suggest that Titan's methane is no longer being actively added to its atmosphere and could be depleted entirely within a few tens of millions of years.

Many of the more prominent mountains and hills have been given official names by the International Astronomical Union. According to JPL, "By convention, mountains on Titan are named for mountains from Middle-earth, the fictional setting in fantasy novels by J. R. R. Tolkien." Colles (collections of hills) are named for characters from the same Tolkien works.

 Dark equatorial terrain 

In the first images of Titan's surface taken by Earth-based telescopes in the early 2000s, large regions of dark terrain were revealed straddling Titan's equator. Prior to the arrival of Cassini, these regions were thought to be seas of liquid hydrocarbons. Dunes of this type are always aligned with average wind direction. In the case of Titan, steady zonal (eastward) winds combine with variable tidal winds (approximately 0.5 meters per second). The tidal winds are the result of tidal forces from Saturn on Titan's atmosphere, which are 400 times stronger than the tidal forces of the Moon on Earth and tend to drive wind toward the equator. This wind pattern, it was hypothesized, causes granular material on the surface to gradually build up in long parallel dunes aligned west-to-east. The dunes break up around mountains, where the wind direction shifts.

The longitudinal (or linear) dunes were initially presumed to be formed by moderately variable winds that either follow one mean direction or alternate between two different directions. Subsequent observations indicate that the dunes point to the east although climate simulations indicate Titan's surface winds blow toward the west. At less than 1 meter per second, they are not powerful enough to lift and transport surface material. Recent computer simulations indicate that the dunes may be the result of rare storm winds that happen only every fifteen years when Titan is in equinox. These storms produce strong downdrafts, flowing eastward at up to 10 meters per second when they reach the surface.

The "sand" on Titan is likely not made up of small grains of silicates like the sand on Earth, but rather might have formed when liquid methane rained and eroded the water-ice bedrock, possibly in the form of flash floods. Alternatively, the sand could also have come from organic solids called tholins, produced by photochemical reactions in Titan's atmosphere. Studies of dunes' composition in May 2008 revealed that they possessed less water than the rest of Titan, and are thus most likely derived from organic soot like hydrocarbon polymers clumping together after raining onto the surface. Calculations indicate the sand on Titan has a density of one-third that of terrestrial sand. The low density combined with the dryness of Titan's atmosphere might cause the grains to clump together because of static electricity buildup. The "stickiness" might make it difficult for the generally mild breeze close to Titan's surface to move the dunes although more powerful winds from seasonal storms could still blow them eastward.

Around equinox, strong downburst winds can lift micron-sized solid organic particles up from the dunes to create Titanian dust storms, observed as intense and short-lived brightenings in the infrared.

 Observation and exploration 

Titan is never visible to the naked eye, but can be observed through small telescopes or strong binoculars. Amateur observation is difficult because of the proximity of Titan to Saturn's brilliant globe and ring system; an occulting bar, covering part of the eyepiece and used to block the bright planet, greatly improves viewing. Titan has a maximum apparent magnitude of +8.2, and mean opposition magnitude 8.4. This compares to +4.6 for the similarly sized Ganymede, in the Jovian system.

Observations of Titan prior to the space age were limited. In 1907 Spanish astronomer Josep Comas i Solà observed limb darkening of Titan, the first evidence that the body has an atmosphere. In 1944 Gerard P. Kuiper used a spectroscopic technique to detect an atmosphere of methane.

 Fly-by missions: Pioneer and Voyager 
The first probe to visit the Saturnian system was Pioneer 11 in 1979, which revealed that Titan was probably too cold to support life. It took images of Titan, including Titan and Saturn together in mid to late 1979. The quality was soon surpassed by the two Voyagers.

Titan was examined by both Voyager 1 and 2 in 1980 and 1981, respectively. Voyager 1's trajectory was designed to provide an optimized Titan flyby, during which the spacecraft was able to determine the density, composition, and temperature of the atmosphere, and obtain a precise measurement of Titan's mass. Atmospheric haze prevented direct imaging of the surface, though in 2004 intensive digital processing of images taken through Voyager 1's orange filter did reveal hints of the light and dark features now known as Xanadu and Shangri-la, which had been observed in the infrared by the Hubble Space Telescope. Voyager 2, which would have been diverted to perform the Titan flyby if Voyager 1 had been unable to, did not pass near Titan and continued on to Uranus and Neptune.

 Cassini–Huygens 

Even with the data provided by the Voyagers, Titan remained a body of mystery—a large satellite shrouded in an atmosphere that makes detailed observation difficult.

The Cassini–Huygens spacecraft reached Saturn on July 1, 2004, and began the process of mapping Titan's surface by radar. A joint project of the European Space Agency (ESA) and NASA, Cassini–Huygens proved a very successful mission. The Cassini probe flew by Titan on October 26, 2004, and took the highest-resolution images ever of Titan's surface, at only , discerning patches of light and dark that would be invisible to the human eye.

Liquid has been found in abundance on the surface in the north polar region, in the form of many lakes and seas discovered by Cassini.

 Huygens landing Huygens was an atmospheric probe that touched down on Titan on January 14, 2005, discovering that many of its surface features seem to have been formed by fluids at some point in the past. Titan is the most distant body from Earth to have a space probe land on its surface.

The Huygens probe landed just off the easternmost tip of a bright region now called Adiri. The probe photographed pale hills with dark "rivers" running down to a dark plain. Current understanding is that the hills (also referred to as highlands) are composed mainly of water ice. Dark organic compounds, created in the upper atmosphere by the ultraviolet radiation of the Sun, may rain from Titan's atmosphere. They are washed down the hills with the methane rain and are deposited on the plains over geological time scales.

After landing, Huygens photographed a dark plain covered in small rocks and pebbles, which are composed of water ice. The two rocks just below the middle of the image on the right are smaller than they may appear: the left-hand one is 15 centimeters across, and the one in the center is 4 centimeters across, at a distance of about 85 centimeters from Huygens. There is evidence of erosion at the base of the rocks, indicating possible fluvial activity. The ground surface is darker than originally expected, consisting of a mixture of water and hydrocarbon ice.

In March 2007, NASA, ESA, and COSPAR decided to name the Huygens landing site the Hubert Curien Memorial Station in memory of the former president of the ESA.

 Dragonfly 

The Dragonfly mission, developed and operated by the Johns Hopkins Applied Physics Laboratory, will launch in June 2027. It consists of a large drone powered by an RTG to fly in the atmosphere of Titan as New Frontiers 4. Its instruments will study how far prebiotic chemistry may have progressed. The mission is planned to arrive at Titan in 2034.

 Proposed or conceptual missions 

There have been several conceptual missions proposed in recent years for returning a robotic space probe to Titan. Initial conceptual work has been completed for such missions by NASA (and JPL), and ESA. At present, none of these proposals have become funded missions.

The Titan Saturn System Mission (TSSM) was a joint NASA/ESA proposal for exploration of Saturn's moons. It envisions a hot-air balloon floating in Titan's atmosphere for six months. It was competing against the Europa Jupiter System Mission (EJSM) proposal for funding. In February 2009 it was announced that ESA/NASA had given the EJSM mission priority ahead of the TSSM.

The proposed Titan Mare Explorer (TiME) was a low-cost lander that would splash down in a lake in Titan's northern hemisphere and float on the surface of the lake for three to six months. It was selected for a Phase-A design study in 2011 as a candidate mission for the 12th NASA Discovery Program opportunity, but was not selected for flight.

Another mission to Titan proposed in early 2012 by Jason Barnes, a scientist at the University of Idaho, is the Aerial Vehicle for In-situ and Airborne Titan Reconnaissance (AVIATR): an unmanned plane (or drone) that would fly through Titan's atmosphere and take high-definition images of the surface of Titan. NASA did not approve the requested $715 million, and the future of the project is uncertain.

A conceptual design for another lake lander was proposed in late 2012 by the Spanish-based private engineering firm SENER and the Centro de Astrobiología in Madrid. The concept probe is called Titan Lake In-situ Sampling Propelled Explorer (TALISE). The major difference compared to the TiME probe would be that TALISE is envisioned with its own propulsion system and would therefore not be limited to simply drifting on the lake when it splashes down.

A Discovery Program contestant for its mission #13 is Journey to Enceladus and Titan (JET), an astrobiology Saturn orbiter that would assess the habitability potential of Enceladus and Titan.

In 2015, the NASA Innovative Advanced Concepts program (NIAC) awarded a Phase II grant to a design study of a Titan Submarine to explore the seas of Titan.Lorenz, R. D.; Oleson, S.; Woytach, J.; Jones, R.; Colozza, A.; Schmitz, P.; Landis, G.; Paul, M.; and Walsh, J. (March 16–20, 2015). "Titan Submarine: Vehicle Design and Operations Concept for the Exploration of the Hydrocarbon Seas of Saturn's Giant Moon", 46th Lunar and Planetary Science Conference, The Woodlands, Texas. LPI Contribution No. 1832, p.1259

 Prebiotic conditions and life 

Titan is thought to be a prebiotic environment rich in complex organic compounds, but its surface is in a deep freeze at  so life as we know it cannot exist on the moon's frigid surface. However, Titan seems to contain a global ocean beneath its ice shell, and within this ocean, conditions are potentially suitable for microbial life.

The Cassini–Huygens mission was not equipped to provide evidence for biosignatures or complex organic compounds; it showed an environment on Titan that is similar, in some ways, to ones hypothesized for the primordial Earth. Scientists surmise that the atmosphere of early Earth was similar in composition to the current atmosphere on Titan, with the important exception of a lack of water vapor on Titan.

 Formation of complex molecules 
The Miller–Urey experiment and several following experiments have shown that with an atmosphere similar to that of Titan and the addition of UV radiation, complex molecules and polymer substances like tholins can be generated. The reaction starts with dissociation of nitrogen and methane, forming hydrogen cyanide and acetylene. Further reactions have been studied extensively.

It has been reported that when energy was applied to a combination of gases like those in Titan's atmosphere, five nucleotide bases, the building blocks of DNA and RNA, were among the many compounds produced. In addition, amino acids, the building blocks of protein were found. It was the first time nucleotide bases and amino acids had been found in such an experiment without liquid water being present.

On April 3, 2013, NASA reported that complex organic chemicals could arise on Titan based on studies simulating the atmosphere of Titan.

On June 6, 2013, scientists at the IAA-CSIC reported the detection of polycyclic aromatic hydrocarbons (PAH) in the upper atmosphere of Titan.

On July 26, 2017, Cassini scientists positively identified the presence of carbon chain anions in Titan's upper atmosphere which appeared to be involved in the production of large complex organics.
These highly reactive molecules were previously known to contribute to building complex organics in the Interstellar Medium, therefore highlighting a possibly universal stepping stone to producing complex organic material.

On July 28, 2017, scientists reported that acrylonitrile, or vinyl cyanide, (C2H3CN), possibly essential for life by being related to cell membrane and vesicle structure formation, had been found on Titan.

In October 2018, researchers reported low-temperature chemical pathways from simple organic compounds to complex polycyclic aromatic hydrocarbon (PAH) chemicals. Such chemical pathways may help explain the presence of PAHs in the low-temperature atmosphere of Titan, and may be significant pathways, in terms of the PAH world hypothesis, in producing precursors to biochemicals related to life as we know it.

 Possible subsurface habitats 
Laboratory simulations have led to the suggestion that enough organic material exists on Titan to start a chemical evolution analogous to what is thought to have started life on Earth. The analogy assumes the presence of liquid water for longer periods than is currently observable; several hypotheses postulate that liquid water from an impact could be preserved under a frozen isolation layer. It has also been hypothesized that liquid-ammonia oceans could exist deep below the surface. Heat transfer between the interior and upper layers would be critical in sustaining any subsurface oceanic life. Detection of microbial life on Titan would depend on its biogenic effects, with the atmospheric methane and nitrogen examined.

 Methane and life at the surface 

It has been speculated that life could exist in the lakes of liquid methane on Titan, just as organisms on Earth live in water. Such organisms would inhale H2 in place of O2, metabolize it with acetylene instead of glucose, and exhale methane instead of carbon dioxide.

All life forms on Earth (including methanogens) use liquid water as a solvent; it is speculated that life on Titan might instead use a liquid hydrocarbon, such as methane or ethane, although water is a stronger solvent than methane. Water is also more chemically reactive, and can break down large organic molecules through hydrolysis. A life form whose solvent was a hydrocarbon would not face the risk of its biomolecules being destroyed in this way.

In 2005, astrobiologist Chris McKay argued that if methanogenic life did exist on the surface of Titan, it would likely have a measurable effect on the mixing ratio in the Titan troposphere: levels of hydrogen and acetylene would be measurably lower than otherwise expected. Assuming metabolic rates similar to those of methanogenic organisms on Earth, the concentration of molecular hydrogen would drop by a factor of 1000 on the Titanian surface solely due to a hypothetical biological sink. McKay noted that, if life is indeed present, the low temperatures on Titan would result in very slow metabolic processes, which could conceivably be hastened by the use of catalysts similar to enzymes. He also noted that the low solubility of organic compounds in methane presents a more significant challenge to any possible form of life. Forms of active transport, and organisms with large surface-to-volume ratios could theoretically lessen the disadvantages posed by this fact.

In 2010, Darrell Strobel, from Johns Hopkins University, identified a greater abundance of molecular hydrogen in the upper atmospheric layers of Titan compared to the lower layers, arguing for a downward flow at a rate of roughly 1028 molecules per second and disappearance of hydrogen near Titan's surface; as Strobel noted, his findings were in line with the effects McKay had predicted if methanogenic life-forms were present. The same year, another study showed low levels of acetylene on Titan's surface, which were interpreted by McKay as consistent with the hypothesis of organisms consuming hydrocarbons. Although restating the biological hypothesis, he cautioned that other explanations for the hydrogen and acetylene findings are more likely: the possibilities of yet unidentified physical or chemical processes (e.g. a surface catalyst accepting hydrocarbons or hydrogen), or flaws in the current models of material flow. Composition data and transport models need to be substantiated, etc. Even so, despite saying that a non-biological catalytic explanation would be less startling than a biological one, McKay noted that the discovery of a catalyst effective at  would still be significant. With regards to the acetylene findings, Mark Allen, the principal investigator with the NASA Astrobiology Institute Titan team, provided a speculative, non-biological explanation: sunlight or cosmic rays could transform the acetylene in icy aerosols in the atmosphere into more complex molecules that would fall to the ground with no acetylene signature.

As NASA notes in its news article on the June 2010 findings: "To date, methane-based life forms are only hypothetical. Scientists have not yet detected this form of life anywhere." As the NASA statement also says: "some scientists believe these chemical signatures bolster the argument for a primitive, exotic form of life or precursor to life on Titan's surface."

In February 2015, a hypothetical cell membrane capable of functioning in liquid methane at cryogenic temperatures (deep freeze) conditions was modeled. Composed of small molecules containing carbon, hydrogen, and nitrogen, it would have the same stability and flexibility as cell membranes on Earth, which are composed of phospholipids, compounds of carbon, hydrogen, oxygen, and phosphorus. This hypothetical cell membrane was termed an "azotosome", a combination of "azote", French for nitrogen, and "liposome".

 Obstacles 
Despite these biological possibilities, there are formidable obstacles to life on Titan, and any analogy to Earth is inexact. At a vast distance from the Sun, Titan is frigid, and its atmosphere lacks CO2. At Titan's surface, water exists only in solid form. Because of these difficulties, scientists such as Jonathan Lunine have viewed Titan less as a likely habitat for life than as an experiment for examining hypotheses on the conditions that prevailed prior to the appearance of life on Earth. Although life itself may not exist, the prebiotic conditions on Titan and the associated organic chemistry remain of great interest in understanding the early history of the terrestrial biosphere. Using Titan as a prebiotic experiment involves not only observation through spacecraft, but laboratory experiments, and chemical and photochemical modeling on Earth.

 Panspermia hypothesis 
It is hypothesized that large asteroid and cometary impacts on Earth's surface may have caused fragments of microbe-laden rock to escape Earth's gravity, suggesting the possibility of panspermia. Calculations indicate that these would encounter many of the bodies in the Solar System, including Titan. On the other hand, Jonathan Lunine has argued that any living things in Titan's cryogenic hydrocarbon lakes would need to be so different chemically from Earth life that it would not be possible for one to be the ancestor of the other.

 Future conditions 
Conditions on Titan could become far more habitable in the far future. Five billion years from now, as the Sun becomes a red giant, its surface temperature could rise enough for Titan to support liquid water on its surface, making it habitable. As the Sun's ultraviolet output decreases, the haze in Titan's upper atmosphere will be depleted, lessening the anti-greenhouse effect on the surface and enabling the greenhouse created by atmospheric methane to play a far greater role. These conditions together could create a habitable environment, and could persist for several hundred million years. This is proposed to have been sufficient time for simple life to spawn on Earth, though the higher viscosity of ammonia-water solutions coupled with low temperatures would cause chemical reactions to proceed more slowly on Titan.

 See also 

 Colonization of Titan
 Lakes of Titan
 Atmosphere of Titan
 Life on Titan
 List of natural satellites
 Saturn's moons in fiction
 The sky of Titan
 Titan in fiction
 Titan Winged Aerobot
 Vid Flumina a river of methane and ethane on Titan

 References 

 Bibliography 
 

 Further reading 
 
 
 
 Jonathan O'Callaghan: A map of Saturn's largest moon. Nature, Vol 575, 426–427, 2019.

 External links 

 
 Cassini–Huygens Mission To Saturn and Titan. Multimedia Feature Titan Virtual Tour
 Video of Huygens’ descent from the ESA
 Cassini Imaging Central Laboratory for Operations (CICLOPS) site Titan image search 
 The Planetary Society (2005). TPS: Saturn's moon Titan. Retrieved March 28, 2005.
 The Alien Noise. This recording is a laboratory reconstruction of the sounds heard by Huygens'' microphones.
 AstronomyCast: Titan  Fraser Cain and Pamela Gay, 2010.
 Titan nomenclature and Titan map with feature names from the USGS planetary nomenclature page
 Google Titan 3D, interactive map of the moon
 Image album by Kevin M. Gill

 
16550325
Discoveries by Christiaan Huygens
Moons with a prograde orbit